Cotana bakeri is a moth in the family Eupterotidae. It was described by James John Joicey and George Talbot in 1917. It is found on New Guinea.

The length of the forewings is about 21 mm. The forewings are yellowish brown, with the apex and outer margin purplish brown, but faintly suffused below vein five and there is a heavy brown straight discal line from the costa at its middle to the middle of the inner margin. The basal area has greyish-white scaling. The hindwings are pale rufous brown with a thin dark discal line, a faint post-discal line and indications of a subterminal line.

References

Moths described in 1917
Eupterotinae